In accelerator physics, the term acceleration voltage means the effective voltage surpassed by a charged particle along a defined straight line. If not specified further, the term is likely to refer to the longitudinal effective acceleration voltage .

The acceleration voltage is an important quantity for the design of microwave cavities for particle accelerators. See also shunt impedance.

For the special case of an electrostatic field that is surpassed by a particle, the acceleration voltage is directly given by integrating the electric field along its path. The following considerations are generalized for time-dependent fields.

Longitudinal voltage 

The longitudinal effective acceleration voltage is given by the kinetic energy gain experienced by a particle with velocity  along a defined straight path (path integral of the longitudinal Lorentz forces) divided by its charge,

.

For resonant structures, e.g.

 with 

Since the particles kinetic energy can only be changed by electric fields, this reduces to

Particle Phase considerations 

Note that by the given definition,  is a complex quantity. This is advantageous, since the relative phase between particle and the experienced field was fixed in the previous considerations (the particle travelling through  experienced maximum electric force).

To account for this degree of freedom, an additional phase factor  is included in the eigenmode field definition

which leads to a modified expression

for the voltage. In comparison to the former expression, only a phase factor with unit length occurs. Thus, the absolute value of the complex quantity  is independent of the particle-to-eigenmode phase . It represents the maximum achievable voltage that is experienced by a particle with optimal phase to the applied field, and is the relevant physical quantity.

Transit time factor 

A quantity named transit time factor

is often defined which relates the effective acceleration voltage  to the time-independent acceleration voltage

.

Transverse voltage 

In symbolic analogy to the longitudinal voltage, one can define effective voltages in two orthogonal directions  that are transversal to the particle trajectory

which describe the integrated forces that deflect the particle from its design path. Since the modes that deflect particles may have arbitrary polarizations, the transverse effective voltage may be defined using polar notation by

with the polarization angle 
For example, if  is defined, then  must hold.

Note that this transverse voltage does not necessarily relate to a real change in the particles energy, since magnetic fields are also able to deflect particles. Also, this is an approximation for small-angle deflection of the particle, where the particles trajectory through the field can still be approximated by a straight line.

References 

Accelerator physics